Miss World Philippines 2017 was the 7th edition of the Miss World Philippines pageant. It was held at the Mall of Asia Arena in Pasay, Metro Manila, Philippines on September 3, 2017. It was the first edition under the new national director, Arnold Vegafria. 

At the end of the event, Catriona Gray crowned Laura Lehmann as Miss World Philippines 2017. Three additional titleholders were also crowned at the event which were Teresita Marquez as Reina Hispanoamericana Filipinas 2017, Cynthia Thomalla as Miss Eco Philippines 2017, and Sophia Señoron as Miss Multinational Philippines 2017. Glyssa Perez was named First Runner-Up, and Zara Carbonell was named Second Runner-Up.

The event was attended by Miss World chairman Julia Morley, Miss World 2016 Stephanie Del Valle, and the Miss World 2016 Continental Queens of Beauty.

Results
Color keys
  The contestant Won in an International pageant.
  The contestant was a Semi-Finalist in an International pageant.

Special Awards

Events

Fast Track Events

Judges 
 Willie Revillame - TV host, Wowowin
 Ed Aitken - Founder and CEO, BYS Cosmetics
 Bryan Lim - VP of Business Development, Bench
 Cathy Valencia - CEO, Cathy Valencia Advanced Skin Clinic
 David Licauco - Mister Chinatown Philippines 2014, 1st Runner Up
 Diether Ocampo - Actor
 Cris Albert - CEO, Fila Philippines
 Ruffa Gutierrez - Actress and Miss World 1993, 2nd Runner Up 
 Stephanie Del Valle - Miss World 2016 from Puerto Rico
 Jorge Ballos - Founder of Soho International Film Festival at New York City
 Ann Li - Blogger and founder of AnnLouieLi 
 Paulo Campos III - co-founder of Zalora Philippines
 Nancy Go - Operations Manager, BlueWater Day Spa
 Farid Schoucair - General Manager, New World Makati Hotel
 Vicky Morales - Broadcaster, TV Host
 Randy Ortiz - Fashion designer
 Yaritza Reyes - Miss World 2016 1st Runner-up from Dominican Republic
 Paolo Roldan - International model
 Roselle Monteverde - Film producer, Regal Films

Contestants
35 contestants competed for the four titles.

Notes

Post-pageant Notes 

 Laura Lehmann competed at Miss World 2017 in Sanya, China and finished as a Top 40 quarter-finalist. Lehmann is also among the five winners of Beauty with a Purpose, part of the Top 10 for the People's Choice award, and one of the winners of the Head to Head Challenge.
 Teresita Ssen Marquez competed at Reina Hispanoamericana 2017 in Santa Cruz, Bolivia where she emerged as the winner. Marquez was the first Asian to be crowned Reina Hispanoamericana. Cynthia Thomalla and Sophia Señoron also emerged as the winners of Miss Eco International 2018 and Miss Multinational 2017, respectively.
 Glyssa Perez competed again at Miss World Philippines in 2019 where she was crowned as the first Miss Philippines Tourism.

References

2017
2017 beauty pageants
2017 in the Philippines